Dyshu tishinoi is the third studio album by Nikolai Noskov, released in October 2000 in Russia. The presentation of the album took place on October 10, 2000 in the Kremlin Palace. The academic chamber orchestra Musica Viva took part in the recording of the album, which also accompanied Noskov during the presentation of the album.

Album information and production 
All music written by Nikolai Noskov unless otherwise stated.

Track listing

External links

References 

Nikolai Noskov albums
2000 albums
Russian-language albums